2018 Cerezo Osaka U-23 season.

Squad
As of 19 February 2016.

J3 League

References

External links
 J.League official site

Cerezo Osaka U-23
Cerezo Osaka U-23 seasons